In Ohio, State Route 6 may refer to:
U.S. Route 6 in Ohio, the only Ohio highway numbered 6 since 1931
Ohio State Route 6 (1923-1927), now SR 4 (Cincinnati to Middletown), SR 73 (Middletown to Franklin), and old US 25 (Franklin to Michigan)
Ohio State Route 6 (1927), now US 250
Ohio State Route 6 (pre-1931), now SR 283